Rachicallis is a genus of flowering plants belonging to the family Rubiaceae.

Its native range is Southeastern Mexico, Caribbean.

Species:
 Rachicallis americana (Jacq.) Hitchc.

References

Rubiaceae
Rubiaceae genera